Route 10A is a  east-west highway connecting the towns of Norwich, Vermont and Hanover, New Hampshire. The route exists as Vermont Route 10A and New Hampshire Route 10A, with each designation carrying about half of the route's length. The route begins in Norwich at an interchange with Interstate 91 and U.S. Route 5 and runs east, crossing the state line and continuing into downtown Hanover, where it ends at New Hampshire Route 10.

Route 10A is a spur route of New Hampshire Route 10 and its extension in Vermont is unrelated to Vermont Route 10.

Route description
VT 10A begins at the exit 13 interchange where I-91 and US 5 meet south of the town of Norwich. It crosses the Ledyard Bridge over the river and enters Hanover, New Hampshire where it becomes NH 10A (West Wheelock Street). NH 10A continues east for  before ending at NH 10 in downtown Hanover near Dartmouth College.

NH 10A is the shortest state highway in New Hampshire.

Major intersections

References

External links

 New Hampshire State Route 10A on Flickr
 Vermont State Route 10A on Flickr

010A
010A
Transportation in Grafton County, New Hampshire
Transportation in Windsor County, Vermont